Eizabeth Jean Berry (born 1983) is an American politician who is a member of the Washington House of Representatives for the 36th district. Elected in 2020, Berry assumed office on January 11, 2021.

Early life and education 
Berry is a native of Phoenix, Arizona. Her father was a trial lawyer, and her mother was a teacher. Berry earned a Bachelor of Arts degree from American University, where she studied communications, law, and government.

Career 
From 2007 to 2010, Berry worked as the legislative director for Congresswoman Gabby Giffords in Washington, D.C. In 2011, she moved to Seattle, where she continued to work in politics. In 2016, she became the executive director of the Washington State Association for Justice. In the 2020 election for district 36 in the Washington House of Representatives, Berry placed first in the Democratic primary and defeated Sarah Reyneveld in the November general election. She assumed office on January 11, 2021.

Personal life 
Berry and her husband, Michael, have two children. They live in Queen Anne, Seattle.

See also 
 2020 Washington House of Representatives election

References 

1983 births
Living people
People from Phoenix, Arizona
Politicians from Seattle
American University alumni
Democratic Party members of the Washington House of Representatives
Women state legislators in Washington (state)
21st-century American women